Five Points may refer to:

Places

Canada
The northern half of Oakwood-Vaughan, neighborhood in Toronto, Ontario

United States
Alabama:
Five Points, Alabama, a town
Five Points South Historic District, Birmingham, listed on the National Register of Historic Places (NRHP) in Jefferson County
Five Points Historic District (Huntsville, Alabama), NRHP-listed
Five Points, California
Five Points, Denver, Colorado
Florida:
Five Points, Florida
Five Points (Jacksonville), Florida
Georgia:
Five Points (Athens), Georgia
Five Points, Atlanta, Georgia
Five Points station, Atlanta, Georgia
Little Five Points, community east of downtown Atlanta, Georgia
Five Points, Indiana (disambiguation), multiple locations
Five Points, Iowa
Five Points, Michigan (disambiguation), multiple locations
Five Points, Minnesota
Five Points, Trenton, New Jersey
Five Points, Manhattan, New York
North Carolina:
Five Points, North Carolina
Five Points, Franklin County, North Carolina
Five Points Historic District (Albemarle)
Five Points Historic Neighborhoods (Raleigh)
Five Points, Ohio (disambiguation), multiple locations
Five Points, Pennsylvania (disambiguation), multiple locations
Five Points (Columbia, South Carolina)
Five Points, Texas
Five Points, West Virginia
Five Points, Wisconsin (disambiguation), multiple locations
Five Points Historic District (disambiguation), multiple locations

Other uses
 Five Points, a literary journal published by Georgia State University, named after the area in Atlanta
 Five Points (TV series), 2018
 Five Points Gang, Manhattan
 Quincunx, a geometric pattern consisting of five points arranged in a cross
 Five dots tattoo

See also 
 5 Pointz, former warehouse and mural venue in Queens, New York City
 Five points determine a conic
 Five Points Correctional Facility, Romulus, New York
 Five Points of Calvinism
 Le Corbusier's Five Points of Architecture

 Five-point electoral law
 Five Point Plan
 Five-point stencil
 Five Corners (disambiguation)
 The 5 Point Cafe

Quadripoints and higher